The Topanga Fire was a wildfire that ignited on September 28, 2005, in the Santa Susana Mountains, to the northwest of Chatsworth and the San Fernando Valley in Southern California.

History
The wildfire grew to more than 16,000 acres (65 km2) in 2 days, threatening homes, natural resources, power lines, and communications equipment in the Simi Hills, in eastern Ventura County, as well as the Conejo Valley region north of the Santa Monica Mountains. 

Experts foresaw the problem as Southern California entered the hottest part of the fire season, with the land covered in brush that grew after the heaviest rains in over 100 years. Although the wind, dry conditions, and steep terrain made the work of firefighters difficult, the loss of property had been low (as of early October); according to news reports from Friday, September 30, one home and handful of outbuildings had been lost. Mandatory evacuations were in place, involving at least 1,500 residents of the area.

On October 2, 2005, over 17,000 acres (69 km2) were burned. Furthermore, only 5% of the blaze was estimated to have been contained by the approximately 3,000 firefighters battling it.

References

External links
NASA Earth Observatory page discussing the wildfires

2005 California wildfires
Wildfires in Los Angeles County, California
Wildfires in Ventura County, California
Santa Susana Mountains
Simi Hills
Agoura Hills, California
Chatsworth, Los Angeles
West Hills, Los Angeles
Woodland Hills, Los Angeles
History of the San Fernando Valley
History of Simi Valley, California
2005 in Los Angeles
September 2005 events in the United States
October 2005 events in the United States